Polyrhaphis hystricina is a species of beetle in the family Cerambycidae. It was described by Henry Walter Bates in 1862. It is known from Brazil and French Guiana.

References

Polyrhaphidini
Beetles described in 1862